Francesc Homs Molist (born 5 September 1969, in Vic, Barcelona) is a Spanish politician and Minister of the Presidency and Spokesperson of the Government of Catalonia.

Early life and education

Francesc Homs was born in Vic in 1969 and holds a degree in Law from the Autonomous University of Barcelona (UAB). He is married and father to two daughters. In his private life, he is a keen cyclist and a practising Roman Catholic.

Political career

He is Minister of the Presidency and Spokesperson of the Government of Catalonia (Generalitat de Catalunya). Previously, he was Secretary General of the Presidency of the Government of Catalonia (2010-2012) and Director General of Interdepartmental Affairs (2001-2003).

He was a member of the Parliament of Catalonia from 2003 to 2010. He was writer of the draft of the new Statute of Catalonia on behalf of Convergència i Unió (CiU), and speaker of the new Statute (2006).

He has worked in several private companies in the service and banking sectors.

He is Vice-Secretary General of Strategy of Convergència Democràtica de Catalunya (CDC) and member of the Executive National Board of Convergència i Unió (CiU). He was the Head of the Project Great House of Catalanism (Projecte de la Casa Gran del Catalanisme), which aimed to remodel and build on the political catalanism.

Publications

He is the author of the books: Catalunya a Judici, Edicions Ara llibres, 2008; Dret a decidir. Estació concert, Edició Base, 2010.

References

1969 births
Living people
Autonomous University of Barcelona alumni
Convergence and Union politicians
Members of the 11th Congress of Deputies (Spain)
Members of the 12th Congress of Deputies (Spain)
Members of the Parliament of Catalonia
People from Vic
Spanish Roman Catholics